The Bastian Prize is a prize awarded annually by the Norwegian Association of Literary Translators.

The prize, established in 1951, is given for translating a published work into Norwegian language. The award is a statue made by Ørnulf Bast, and usually a monetary grant as well.

List of winners
These are the winners of the Bastian Prize:

Regular class
1951 : Helge Simonsen
1952 : Eli Krog
1953 : Åke Fen
1954 : Nils Lie
1955 : Leo Strøm
1956 : Elsa Uhlen
1957 : Peter Magnus
1958 : André Bjerke
1959 : Odd Bang-Hansen
1960 : Hartvig Kiran
1961 : Halldis Moren Vesaas
1962 : Trygve Greiff
1963 : Carl Hambro
1964 : Brikt Jensen
1965 : Sigmund Skard
1966 : Hans Braarvig
1967 : Åse-Marie Nesse
1968 : Albert Lange Fliflet
1969 : Milada Blekastad
1970 : Lotte Holmboe
1971 : Axel Amlie
1972 : Ivar Eskeland
1973 : Trond Winje
1974 : Tom Rønnow
1975 : Kjell Risvik
1976 : Carl Fredrik Engelstad
1977 : Erik Gunnes
1978 : Geir Kjetsaa
1979 : Arne Dørumsgaard
1980 : Carsten Middelthon
1981 : Anne-Lisa Amadou
1982 : Hans Aaraas
1983 : Ole Michael Selberg
1984 : Knut Ødegård
1985 : Herbert Svenkerud
1986 : Ivar Orgland
1987 : Anne Elligers
1988 : Camilla Wulfsberg
1989 : Turid Farbregd
1990 : Inger Gjelsvik
1991 : Mona Lange
1992 : Aud Greiff
1993 : Karin Gundersen
1994 : Merete Alfsen
1995 : Nils Ivar Agøy
1996 : Kåre Langvik-Johannessen
1997 : Johannes Gjerdåker
1998 : Solveig Schult Ulriksen
1999 : Christian Rugstad
2000 : Erik Ringen
2001 : Kari Kemény
2002 : Birger Huse
2003 : Arne Worren
2004 : Dag Heyerdahl Larsen
2005 : Bård Kranstad
2006 : Olav Angell
2007 : Grete Kleppen
2008 : Per Qvale
2009 : Tom Lotherington
2010 : Isak Rogde
2011 : Knut Ofstad
2012 : Ika Kaminka
2013 : Tommy Watz
2014 : Eve-Marie Lund
2015 : Oskar Vistdal
2016 : Kristina Solum
2017 : Bjørn Herrman
2018 : Mikael Holmberg
2019 : Sverre Dahl
2020 : Gøril Eldøen
2021 : Geir Pollen
2022 : Kirstin Vogt

Children's literature
1984 : Zinken Hopp, Johannes Farestveit
1985 : Siri Ness
1986 : Tor Edvin Dahl
1987 : Kari Skjønsberg
1988 : Tormod Haugen
1989 : Isak Rogde
1990 : Tove Gravem Smedstad
1991 : Mette Newth
1992 : Johan Fredrik Grøgaard
1993 : Jo Giæver Tenfjord
1994 : Lars Vikør
1995 : Halldis Moren Vesaas
1996 : none
1997 : Erik J. Krogstad
1998 : Jo Ørjasæter
1999 : Henning Hagerup
2000 : Torstein Bugge Høverstad
2001 : Gunnel Malmstrøm
2002 : Øystein Rosse
2003 : Tove Bakke
2004 : Fartein Døvle Jonassen
2005 : Guri Vesaas
2006 : Merete Alfsen
2007 : none
2008 : Ragnar Hovland
2009 : Kyrre Haugen Bakke
2010 : none
2011 : Carina Westberg
2012 : none
2013 : Bjørn Herrman
2014 : Eivind Lilleskjæret
2015 : Torleif Sjøgren-Erichsen
2016 : Stian Omland
2017 : Tiril Broch Aakre
2018 : Nina Aspen
2019 : Kirsti Vogt
2020 : Kari Bolstad
2021 : Vibeke Saugestad
2022 : Hilde Stubhaug

References 

Norwegian literary awards
Translation awards
Awards established in 1951
1951 establishments in Norway